Dichomeris cyprophanes is a moth in the family Gelechiidae. It was described by Edward Meyrick in 1918. It is found in the South African province of KwaZulu-Natal.

The wingspan is 14–15 mm. The forewings are deep blue purple, towards the apex and termen becoming bright coppery. There is a faint oblique coppery strigula on the costa at three-fourths. The hindwings are grey.

References

Endemic moths of South Africa
Moths described in 1913
cyprophanes